Cyril Kobina Ben-Smith (born 21 February 1964) is a Ghanaian Anglican Bishop. He is the current Bishop of Asante Mampong and was elected Archbishop of the Church of the Province of West Africa in June 2022, in succession to Archbishop Jonathan Hart of Liberia.

Although brought up near Ghana's second city, Kumasi, Dr Ben-Smith has studied and ministered abroad, including in South Korea and the United Kingdom, completing his doctoral studies at the University of Cardiff, Wales.

In 2021, Dr Ben-Smith and the Province of Ghana were criticized by the Archbishop of Canterbury, Justin Welby, and other bishops and dioceses of the Anglican Communion, for openly supporting an anti-LGBT law in Ghana, which would make it illegal to declare oneself as an LGBT individual, force those individuals to undergo conversion therapy, and criminalising support groups and advocacy for LGBT people. A statement, apparently released by the church and signed by Ben-Smith, denounced homosexuality as "unbiblical and ungodly". Although defending the integrity of the Ghanaian social context and its complex political landscape, Archbishop Cyril subsequently distanced himself and his church from the language of the document, reaffirming the basis of the Lambeth Conferences that condemns all persecution and prejudice on the basis of sexual orientation. The Archbishop of Canterbury welcomed this declaration while expressing regret for his first statement on the matter, which was released prior to communication with the Anglican Church of Ghana.

References

Anglican bishops of Asante Mampong
21st-century Anglican bishops in Ghana
Living people
1964 births